U.C. Sampdoria enjoyed its best season since 1993–94, when the club finished third in Serie A and won Coppa Italia. In 2004-05 Sampdoria was able to finish fifth in the standings, thanks to a robust defence and a goalscoring ace in secondary striker Francesco Flachi, who played the football of his life. With only 29 goals conceded, the defence of Sampdoria was fully comparable with those of top sides Juventus and Milan, and coach Walter Novellino was hailed for the strong performance in the club's second season since its return to Serie A.

Squad

Goalkeepers
  Francesco Antonioli
  Luigi Turci
  Daniele Padelli
  Emanuele Bianchi

Defenders
  Moris Carrozzieri
  Marcello Castellini
  Giulio Falcone
  Marco Pisano
  Simone Pavan
  Stefano Sacchetti
  Cristian Zenoni

Midfielders
  Sergio Volpi
  Andrea Gasbarroni
  Mark Edusei
  Angelo Palombo
  Max Tonetto
  Aimo Diana
  Cristiano Doni
  Vincenzo Iacopino
  Biagio Pagano

Attackers
  Simone Inzaghi
  Francesco Flachi
  Fabio Bazzani
  Vitali Kutuzov
  Fausto Rossini
  Thomas Job

Serie A

Matches

 Sampdoria-Lazio 0-1
 0-1 Paolo Di Canio (29 pen)
 Siena-Sampdoria 2-1
 0-1 Francesco Flachi (5)
 1-1 Simone Vergassola (10)
 2-1 Daniele Portanova (71)
 Sampdoria-Juventus 0-3
 0-1 Alessandro Del Piero (19 pen)
 0-2 Zlatan Ibrahimović (69)
 0-3 David Trezeguet (87)
 Fiorentina-Sampdoria 0-2
 0-1 Fabio Bazzani (11)
 0-2 Stefano Sacchetti (64)
 Sampdoria-Livorno 2-0
 1-0 Fausto Rossini (78)
 2-0 Aimo Diana (88)
 Reggina-Sampdoria 0-1
 0-1 Fabio Bazzani (36)
 Sampdoria-Brescia 0-1
 0-1 Luigi Di Biagio (58 pen)
 Chievo-Sampdoria 0-2
 0-1 Sergio Volpi (32)
 0-2 Aimo Diana (35)
 Sampdoria-Milan 0-1
 0-1 Andriy Shevchenko (76)
 Atalanta-Sampdoria 0-0
 Sampdoria-Cagliari 0-0
 Palermo-Sampdoria 2-0
 1-0 Luca Toni (18)
 2-0 Franco Brienza (47)
 Sampdoria-Parma 1-0
 1-0 Francesco Flachi (90 + 4 pen)
 Roma-Sampdoria 1-1
 0-1 Biagio Pagano (81)
 1-1 Francesco Totti (84 pen)
 Sampdoria-Messina 1-0
 1-0 Francesco Flachi (16)
 Lecce-Sampdoria 1-4
 0-1 Francesco Flachi (37 pen)
 0-2 Francesco Flachi (50)
 1-2 Mirko Vučinić (53)
 1-3 Max Tonetto (60)
 1-4 Vitaly Kutuzov (90 + 2)
 Sampdoria-Udinese 2-0
 1-0 Francesco Flachi (68)
 2-0 Marcello Castellini (75)
 Inter-Sampdoria 3-2
 0-1 Max Tonetto (44)
 0-2 Vitaly Kutuzov (83)
 1-2 Obafemi Martins (88)
 2-2 Christian Vieri (90 + 1)
 3-2 Álvaro Recoba (90 + 4)
 Sampdoria-Bologna 0-0
 Lazio-Sampdoria 1-2
 0-1 Vitaly Kutuzov (1)
 0-2 Francesco Flachi (4 pen)
 1-2 Tommaso Rocchi (64)
 Sampdoria-Siena 1-1
 0-1 Simone Vergassola (66)
 1-1 Fausto Rossini (79)
 Juventus-Sampdoria 0-1
 0-1 Aimo Diana (34)
 Sampdoria-Fiorentina 3-0
 1-0 Francesco Flachi (15)
 2-0 Max Tonetto (33)
 3-0 Aimo Diana (74)
 Livorno-Sampdoria 1-0
 1-0 Cristiano Lucarelli (82)
 Sampdoria-Reggina 3-2
 1-0 Francesco Flachi (8)
 2-0 Francesco Flachi (45)
 2-1 Giuseppe Colucci (49)
 3-1 Francesco Flachi (70 pen)
 3-2 Giacomo Tedesco (88)
 Brescia-Sampdoria 0-1
 0-1 Max Tonetto (75)
 Sampdoria-Chievo 1-0
 1-0 Andrea Gasbarroni (81)
 Milan-Sampdoria 1-0
 1-0 Kaká (65)
 Sampdoria-Atalanta 1-2
 0-1 Stephen Makinwa (3)
 1-1 Cristiano Doni (30)
 1-2 Cesare Natali (68)
 Cagliari-Sampdoria 0-0
 Sampdoria-Palermo 1-0
 1-0 Francesco Flachi (90 pen)
 Parma-Sampdoria 1-1
 0-1 Andrea Gasbarroni (35)
 1-1 Alberto Gilardino (39)
 Sampdoria-Roma 2-1
 1-0 Max Tonetto (32)
 2-0 Francesco Flachi (89 pen)
 2-1 Vincenzo Montella (90 + 2 pen)
 Messina-Sampdoria 2-2
 0-1 Francesco Flachi (27)
 1-1 Riccardo Zampagna (31)
 2-1 Riccardo Zampagna (60)
 2-2 Sergio Volpi (75)
 Sampdoria-Lecce 3-0
 1-0 Aimo Diana (22)
 2-0 Vitaly Kutuzov (31)
 3-0 Mark Edusei (41)
 Udinese-Sampdoria 1-1
 0-1 Marcello Castellini (25)
 1-1 Marco Pisano (36 og)
 Sampdoria-Inter 0-1
 0-1 Adriano (36)
 Bologna-Sampdoria 0-0

Topscorers
  Francesco Flachi 14
  Max Tonetto 5
  Aimo Diana 4
  Vitaly Kutuzov 4

Sources
  RSSSF - Italy 2004/05

U.C. Sampdoria seasons
Sampdoria